Culberson County Airport  is a county-owned public-use airport located three miles (5 km) northeast of the central business district of Van Horn, a town in Culberson County, Texas, United States.

Facilities and aircraft 
(1,829 x 23 m) and 7/25 measuring 5,353 x 75 ft. (1,632 x 23 m). For the 12-month period ending April 27, 2007, the airport had 500 aircraft operations: 60% general aviation and 40% military.

History 
During World War II the airfield was used by the United States Army Air Forces

See also
 Texas World War II Army Airfields

References

External links 

Airports in Texas
Airfields of the United States Army Air Forces in Texas
Buildings and structures in Culberson County, Texas
Transportation in Culberson County, Texas